is a professional Japanese baseball player. He plays pitcher for the Hiroshima Toyo Carp.

He selected .

Personal
His elder brother 
 is also a professional baseball player currently playing for Saitama Seibu Lions.

References

External links

NPB.com

1992 births
Living people
Hiroshima Toyo Carp players
Japanese baseball players
Nippon Professional Baseball pitchers
Baseball people from Kagoshima Prefecture